"Feelin' You" is the fifth single by dance vocal band Bright, released under Rhythm Zone. The title track "Feelin' You" is a summer pop song. The song "Still..." is written by Megumi making it the first song written by a member of the group. "Dream Girls" is a cover of the well-known theme song for the musical and movie Dreamgirls.

Track listing

Charts

References

2009 singles
Bright (Japanese band) songs
2009 songs
Rhythm Zone singles
Song articles with missing songwriters